Gol Gol or Gulgul or Kulkul may refer to:

 Gol Gol, Hamadan, Iran
 Gol Gol, Kermanshah, Iran
 Gol Gol, New South Wales, Australia
 Gol Gol Rural District, Iran
 Golgol River
 Bagh-e Gol Gol, Iran
 Sepideh-ye Gol Gol, Iran
 Gol Gol-e Olya (disambiguation)
 Gol Gol-e Sofla (disambiguation)
 Kulkul, a version of Portuguese filhós in Goa that are eaten during the Christmas season
 Kul-kul, a drumtower in Balinese Hindu temple architecture

See also
 Kol Kol (disambiguation)
 Kalkal (disambiguation)